Family Life is a 1971 Polish drama film directed by Krzysztof Zanussi. It was entered into the 1971 Cannes Film Festival. The film was also selected as the Polish entry for the Best Foreign Language Film at the 44th Academy Awards, but was not accepted as a nominee.

Cast
 Daniel Olbrychski - Ziemowit Braun, called Wit
 Maja Komorowska - Bella Braun
 Jan Kreczmar - Father of Ziemowit and Bella
 Halina Mikolajska - Jadwiga, aunt of Ziemowit and Bella
 Jan Nowicki - Marek
 Anna Milewska - translator
 Jerzy Bińczycki - Wit's boss
 Barbara Sołtysik - Wit's co-worker
 Wiesław Kornak - Wit's co-worker
 Barbara Kobrzyńska - secretary
 Karol Strasburger - man
 Anna Nehrebecka - woman

See also
 List of submissions to the 44th Academy Awards for Best Foreign Language Film
 List of Polish submissions for the Academy Award for Best Foreign Language Film

References

External links

1971 films
1971 drama films
Polish drama films
1970s Polish-language films
Films directed by Krzysztof Zanussi
Films scored by Wojciech Kilar